A birdcage is a cage for birds.

Birdcage or bird cage variants may also refer to:
Maserati Tipo 61
Flash suppressor on a rifle
The Birdcage, 1996 American film
The Bird Cage, a novel by Eimar O'Duffy

See also
Bird-cage lantern, lantern common to American lighthouses in the early years of the nineteenth century
Bird Cage Theatre